The Roman Catholic Diocese of Jundiaí is a diocese located in the city of Jundiaí in the Ecclesiastical province of Sorocaba in Brazil.

History
 7 November 1966: Established as Diocese of Jundiaí from the Metropolitan Archdiocese of Campinas and Metropolitan Archdiocese of São Paulo

Bishops
 Bishops of Jundiaí (Roman rite)
 BIshop Arnaldo Carvalheiro Neto (15 June 2022 – present)
 Bishop Vicente Costa (30 December 2009 – 15 June 2022)
 Bishop Gil Antônio Moreira (7 January 2004 – 28 January 2009), appointed Archbishop of Juiz de Fora, Minas Gerais
 Bishop Amaury Castanho (2 October 1996 – 7 January 2004)
 Bishop Roberto Pinarello de Almeida (11 March 1982 – 2 October 1996)
 Bishop Gabriel Paulino Bueno Couto, O. Carm. (21 November 1966 – 11 March 1982)

Coadjutor bishops
Roberto Pinarello de Almeida (1980–1982)
Amaury Castanho (1989–1996)

Auxiliary bishop
Roberto Pinarello de Almeida (1971–1980), appointed Coadjutor here

Other priests of this diocese who became bishops
Joaquim Justino Carreira, appointed Auxiliary Bishop of São Paulo in 2005
Joaquim Wladimir Lopes Dias, appointed Auxiliary Bishop of Vitória, Espirito Santo in 2011

References
 
 
 
 

Roman Catholic dioceses in Brazil
Christian organizations established in 1966
Jundiaí, Roman Catholic Diocese of
Roman Catholic dioceses and prelatures established in the 20th century